Chartoscirta is a genus of true bugs belonging to the family Saldidae.

The genus was first described by Stål in 1868.

The species of this genus are found in Europe.

Species:
 Chartoscirta cincta
 Chartoscirta cocksii
 Chartoscirta elegantula

References

Saldidae